is a women's football club playing in Japan's Hokkaido League. Its hometown is the city of Sapporo, Hokkaido.

Squad

Current squad
As of 14 July 2020. 

 (c)

Results

Transition of team name
FC Adooma : 2004 - 2006
ASC Adooma : 2007 - 2009
Norddea Hokkaido : 2010 – Present

The team name comes from Italian Nord (north) and dea (goddess).

References

External links 
 Norddea Hokkaido official site
 Japanese Club Teams

Women's football clubs in Japan
Association football clubs established in 2012
2012 establishments in Japan
Sports teams in Sapporo